Michelle Anne Muldrow (born 1968) is an American painter known for her colorful compositions featuring the familiar interior landscapes of big-box retail stores.  The paintings walk a line between abstraction and reality, depicting, in the artist's words: “…not only the actual structural space and overwhelming chaos of goods, but also the psychology and vernacular of American consumerism.” Muldrow works in gouache, a traditional water-based paint similar to, but more opaque than, watercolor.  Her compositions draw on the conventions of traditional landscape painting, utilizing them to focus on non-traditional subjects.  Critics have noted that the paintings, whether of a retail interior, a post-industrial landscape, or a reconstructed aerial view of a military base, give the impression that “She’s holding a mirror to... The existence of an era or a generation...”.

Education 
1986-1990 University of Minnesota, Bachelor of Fine Arts

2004 Cooper Union Summer Arts Residency

Awards 
2009 Creative Workforce Fellowship Grant, Cuyahoga County, Ohio

Publications 
2010 New American Paintings, Midwest Edition

References

1968 births
Living people
21st-century American painters
American women painters
21st-century American women artists
University of Minnesota alumni